Theadore Brown (July 30, 1990 – August 12, 2022), known professionally as Teddy Ray, was an American comedian and actor. He was best known for his stand-up acts and for the Internet memes inspired by his viral videos.

Biography 
Ray was born and raised in Los Angeles.

Ray made his television debut on ComicView. He later gained prominence as a comedian after appearing on comedy series such as Comedy Central and All Def Comedy. Ray also appeared on a number of comedy shows including Wild ‘N Out (season 8), MTV's Messyness, and as a bailiff on HBO's PAUSE with Sam Jay.

Ray was a regular performer at comedy clubs such as The Improv and Laugh Factory.

Ray died on August 12, 2022, at the age of 32.

References

External links 

 

1990 births
2022 deaths
American comedians
American stand-up comedians
People from Los Alamitos, California